Aarah as a place name may refer to the following places in the Maldives:
 Aarah (Kaafu Atoll)
 Aarah (Raa Atoll) 
 Aarah (Vaavu Atoll)

See also
 Arrah, Bihar, India
 Arrah, Ivory Coast